Ji-Tu Cumbuka (March 4, 1940 – July 4, 2017) was an American actor.
He is best remembered as "Torque" in the hit TV series A Man Called Sloane together with Robert Conrad and Dan O'Herlihy.

In 2011, Cumbuka published his autobiography A Giant to Remember: The Black Actor in Hollywood. He has a son and a granddaughter.

Early life 
Cumbuka was born in 1940 in Helena, Alabama, to a Baptist minister.

After Texas Southern, he moved to California to pursue his acting career, and went to Columbia College in New York City, earning a bachelor of arts in theatre and a master's degree in cinematography. He landed a role in the 1968 movie Uptight directed by Jules Dassin.

Acting career 
Cumbuka appeared in such television productions as the Roots miniseries, Daniel Boone, Young Dan'l Boone, Knots Landing, The A-Team, The Dukes of Hazzard, Murder She Wrote, Walker, Texas Ranger, CSI: Crime Scene Investigation, Amen, 227, Sanford and Son, Hunter, and In the Heat of the Night.

He was a main cast member of the hit spy TV series A Man Called Sloane with Robert Conrad and Dan O'Herlihy.

Cumbuka also appeared in numerous films. He appeared as former NBA guard Oscar Robertson in the biodrama pic Maurie (1973) about the life of Maurice Stokes. In Harlem Nights (1989), he plays the toothless drunk gambler who gets shot over money. Other films in which he appeared include (but are not limited to) Change of Habit with Elvis Presley  (1969), Blacula (1972), Trader Horn (1973), Lost in the Stars (1974), Mandingo (1975), Dr. Black, Mr. Hyde (1976), Bound for Glory (1976), The Jericho Mile (1979), Doin' Time (1985), Brewster's Millions (1985), Volunteers (1985), Out of Bounds (1986), Moving (1988), and Caged in Paradiso (1990).
Cumbuka wrote, produce, and acted in the gospel musical play Help Somebody, co-starring with Kene Holliday, Hall Williams, Ali Woodson, and Glynn Turman. It debuted in Washington, D.C. in the late 90s.

Death 

Cumbuka died at the age of 77 on July 4, 2017, after a six-month battle with cancer.

Filmography

References

External links 
 

1940 births
2017 deaths
American male film actors
American male stage actors
American male television actors
African-American male actors
Male actors from Montgomery, Alabama
Columbia University School of the Arts alumni
United States Army soldiers
Writers from Alabama
Columbia College (New York) alumni
20th-century African-American people
21st-century African-American people